John Francis Dodge (October 25, 1864 – January 14, 1920) was an American automobile manufacturing pioneer and co-founder of Dodge Brothers Company.

Biography
Dodge was born in Niles, Michigan, where his father ran a foundry and machine shop. John and his younger brother, Horace, were inseparable as children and as adults. The origins of the Dodge family lie in Stockport, England, where their ancestral home still stands.

In 1886, the Dodge family moved to Detroit, where John and Horace took jobs at a boiler maker plant. In 1894 they went to work as machinists at the Dominion Typograph Company in Windsor, Ontario, Canada. While John was the sales-minded managerial type, his brother Horace was a gifted mechanic and inveterate tinkerer. Using a dirt-proof ball bearing Horace invented and patented, in 1897 Dodge arranged a deal for the brothers to join with a third-party investor to manufacture bicycles. Within a few years, they sold the bicycle business and in 1900 used the proceeds of the sale to set up their own machine shop in Detroit.

In their first year of business, the Dodge brothers' company began making parts for the automobile industry. In 1902 the Dodge brothers won a contract to build transmissions for the Olds Motor Vehicle Company upon which they built a solid reputation for quality and service. However, the following year they turned down a second contract from Olds to retool their Detroit plant at Hastings Street and Monroe Avenue to build engines for Henry Ford in a deal that included a share position in the new Ford Motor Company. By 1910, John Dodge and his brother were so successful they built a new plant in Hamtramck, Michigan.

For ten years (1903–1913), the Dodge brothers' business was a Ford Motor Company supplier, and Dodge worked as vice president of the Ford company. He left Ford in 1913, and in 1914 he and Horace formed Dodge Brothers to develop their own line of automobiles. They began building motor trucks for the United States military during the arms buildup for World War I, and in October 1917 they produced their first commercial car. At war's end, their company produced and marketed both cars and trucks.

He was inducted into the Automotive Hall of Fame in 1997.

Because of his temper and often crude behavior, the red-haired  Dodge was seen as socially unacceptable to most of the well-heeled elite of Detroit. Nevertheless, his wealth made him an influential member of the community and he became active in Republican Party politics in Michigan.

Family
The Dodge brothers were the sons of machinist Daniel Rugg Dodge (1819–1897) and Maria Duval Casto (1823–1906). Maria was Daniel's second wife. They had an elder full sister: Della Lone (1863–1936) and older half brother Charles Frontier Dodge (1855–1926), and half sister Laura Belle (1858-?) from Daniel's first marriage to Lorinda Gould (1820–1860).

John Dodge married Canadian Ivy Hawkins (1864–1901) in September 1892. They had three children:
Winifred (1894–1980)
Isabel Cleves (1896–1962)
John Duval Dodge (1898–1942)

Following Ivy (Hawkins) Dodge's death from tuberculosis, he secretly married Isabelle Smith (who was his housekeeper) in Walkerville, Ontario, on December 8, 1902. They separated in 1905 and quietly divorced in 1907; the marriage was kept secret until after the death of his third wife. Shortly after the divorce from Isabelle, Dodge married his secretary, Matilda Rausch (1883–1967). Dodge had three more children with Matilda:
Frances Matilda (1914–1971)
Daniel George (1917–1938)
Anna Margaret (1919–1924)

In 1908, John Dodge and Matilda purchased the land for Meadow Brook Farms near Rochester, Michigan. At Meadow Brook, their eldest child, Frances, developed a love of horses that led her to acquire Castleton Farm in Lexington, Kentucky, and turn it into one of the leading horse breeding operations in the United States. Dodge's daughter Isabel established Brookmeade Stable. It became a major participant in Thoroughbred horse racing and owned several Champions, including the U.S. Racing Hall of Fame horses Cavalcade and Sword Dancer. Five years after Dodge's death in 1920, Matilda married Alfred Wilson and they built the  Meadow Brook Hall at the Rochester estate.

His great grandson is film producer John F Dodge III.

Death and legacy

John and Horace contracted influenza and pneumonia while in New York City during the 1918 flu pandemic. John died on January 14, 1920, at the Ritz-Carlton, age 55. He was interred in the Egyptian-style family mausoleum in Detroit's Woodlawn Cemetery guarded by two Sphinx statues.

Horace died the following December, and in 1925 their widows sold the Dodge Brothers automobile business to Dillon Read, investment bankers, for $146 million (equivalent to $ in ). Dodge's newborn daughter Anna Margaret died of the measles before age five. His son Daniel drowned in the waters off Manitoulin Island after falling overboard while being transported to hospital following an accident involving dynamite. He had just recently married, at age 21.

After Dodge's death, Matilda married Alfred Wilson and adopted two children with him, Richard and Barbara Wilson. Matilda Dodge Wilson was Lieutenant Governor of Michigan briefly in 1940 under Republican Governor Luren Dickinson.

In 1957, the Wilsons donated their  Meadow Brook Farm, including Meadow Brook Hall, Sunset Terrace and all its other buildings and collections, along with $2 million (equivalent to $ in ), to Michigan State University to establish an extension campus. In 1963, the Michigan State University-Oakland was renamed Oakland University.

References

Footnotes

Works cited

External links

Dodge family
1864 births
1920 deaths
American founders of automobile manufacturers
American automotive pioneers
Ford executives
Businesspeople from Detroit
People from Niles, Michigan
Deaths from the Spanish flu pandemic in New York (state)
Michigan Republicans
Burials at Woodlawn Cemetery (Detroit)
Deaths from pneumonia in New York City